Freehill is a surname. Notable people with the surname include:

Francis Freehill (1854–1908), Australian solicitor and activist
Mary Freehill (born 1946), Lord Mayor of Dublin
Maurice Freehill (1899–1939), British World War I flying ace